Locked is an Indian Telugu-language crime thriller streaming television miniseries written and directed by Pradeep Deva Kumar. It stars Satya Dev, Samyukta Hornad, Sri Lakshmi, Keshav Deepak, Aberaam Varma, Vasu Inturi, Bindu Pagidimarri, and John Kottoly. The plot follows Dr. Anand Chakravarthy (Kancharana), a neurosurgeon who is trapped inside his own mansion with uninvited guests and robbers. Season 1 has 7 episodes and premiered on Aha on 25 March 2020. In July 2021, it was announced that the series would be renewed for the second season.

Plot 
Dr. Anand Chakravarthy is a successful neurosurgeon who has never lost a patient, owing to his extensive research on brain surgeries. One day, he saves a child who was in a critical condition and leaves for his house. However, Padmini a thief who wants money to provide a good life to her grand child hires Vaishnavi an ex-IT employee who wants to take care of her mentally ill sister, and Siva a cab driver who tries to commit suicide due to his breakup for not having money became a gang to rob bachelor's homes. They entered Anand's house to carry out a robbery. After a lot of chaos, they try to outsmart Anand, but finally, he gets hold of them and locks them in a room.

Meanwhile, his colleague, Dr. Misbah, an anesthesiologist arrives at Anand's house as he’s tired of his wife Fatima’s suspicious nature. Though Anand does not want to host him, he agrees reluctantly. Much to the dismay of Misbah, Fatima also arrives in the house to share her feelings with Anand. Misbah and Fatima accuse each other of cheating. On the other hand, Inspector Sivalingam who was at the house for a drink finds a mysterious black cover filled with body organs. He questions Anand about it threatening to arrest him but Anand slices a knife through his stomach killing him grotesquely. Fatima tries to escape but she is caught by Anand's henchman.

Anand's junior Avinash is an admirer of Anand and owed to him by saving his mother by conducting a successful surgery on a rare tumor. Later he finds out that Anand is carrying out research by kidnapping and killing homeless people. Then he is also held captive by Anand. He explains about his research to him that he was trying a dead man alive by recreating the memory of the human brain back. He decided to work on this research after his loving wife Sudha's death who died of brain cancer. He announces that he was going to succeed in his research in a week by killing them and researching their brains. His aim is to make a man alive by making his memories back through the Altering the memories. He announces to starts the surgery with his wife making her alive by recreating her memories back.

As the night progresses, there is a power outage which gives the guests a chance to escape while escaping Fathima kills Anand's henchman but the house is locked from outside. Then however Avinash has managed to escape and grabs his research book then blackmails Anand to destroying the book in exchange for saving their lives. But Anand is not bothered by his warnings and says that his research is on his mind because he practically gained all the knowledge. He was writing this book to his next generation of enthusiastic doctors like Avinash who makes a better world to live in.

Meanwhile, all try to escape but Anand holds them back again. After knowing that Siva had been killed and his brain is taken by Anand, Padmini hatches a plan to kill Anand for saving their lives. In that struggle, Vaishnavi successfully escapes from the house and the house becomes dark.

Six months later, Vaishnavi is back to the IT industry and Anand gives a sudden visit to her house offering her a lump sum amount for keeping his secrets with a warning not to go against him. Vaishnavi curiously asks about the remaining people to which Anand replies with a smirks and leaves which reveals that he killed all the people and taken their brains for his research. Later depressed and dehydrated Avinash leaves his class and goes home. He checks his head which had been operated. It reveals that Avinash was shocked after looking at his mother in the abducted people and pleads with Anand to spare him and his mother. Anand does a mysterious surgery on him and leaves them. The following day's newspaper front headline reads "successor in Hyderabad: Altering memory modules."

Cast 

 Satya Dev as Dr. Anand Chakravarthy 
 Samyukta Hornad as Vaishnavi 
 Sri Lakshmi as  Padmini 
 Keshav Deepak as Dr. Misbah 
 Aberaam Varma as Avinash 
 Vasu Inturi as Inspector Sivalingam
 Bindu Pagidimarri as Fatima
 Phanindra Gollapalli as House Owner
 John Kottoly as Unnamed henchman
 Rishikanth as Sagar
 Kaushik as Unknown victim
 Pradeep Yarlagadda as victim's father
 Sri Divya as victim's mother
 Master Harshit as Vicky
 Deepthi as Nurse
 Phanindra as Dr. Cheliyan

Episodes

Reception 
Locked opened to positive reviews from the critics. Neeshita Nyapathi of The Times of India rated the series 3 stars out of 5 and stated "Locked keeps you engrossed and is brave for a Telugu series." Nyapathi appreciated the performances, writing that "Satyadev shoulders the mini-series with his performance, making the switch to show off all the shades of his character with remarkable ease. Sri Lakshmi, Samyuktha, Keshav and Inturi too fare well."

India Today editor Janani K opined that the series is "intriguing in parts." Though she criticized the series for "tardy screenplay" and "logical loopholes," K opined that the it picks momentum in latter half. She termed the performances of Kancharana, Hornad, and Lakshmi as "top-notch" and felt that the series is strong on the technical front.

Prathysu Parasuraman of Film Companion also praised the performances but opined that the series lost its charm midway. A reviewer from Sakshi appreciated Locked for its narration, performances and technical aspects but was critical about some of its loopholes and dark tone.

References

External links 
 

Indian web series
2020 web series debuts
Telugu-language web series
2020s Indian television miniseries
Indian crime thriller films
Indian thriller television series
Aha (streaming service) original programming